Bosnia and Herzegovina competed in the Summer Olympic Games as an independent nation for the first time at the 1992 Summer Olympics in Barcelona, Spain.  Previously, Bosnian and Herzegovinian athletes competed for Yugoslavia at the Olympic Games.

Competitors
The following is the list of number of competitors in the Games.

Athletics

Men
Field events

Women
Track and Road Events

Canoeing

Sprint
Men

Judo

Men

Shooting

Women

Swimming

Men

Women

Weightlifting

Men

References 

Official Olympic Reports

Nations at the 1992 Summer Olympics
1992
Olympics